Houston Elementary School may refer to:

Sam Houston Elementary School, McAllen, Texas, in the McAllen Independent School District
Houston Elementary School, Talladega, Alabama, in Talladega City School District
Houston Elementary School, Visalia, California, in Visalia Unified School District
Henry H. Houston Elementary School, Philadelphia, Pennsylvania, in School District of Philadelphia
Houston Elementary School, Spartanburg, South Carolina, in Spartanburg County School District
Houston (Josephine Houston) Elementary School, Austin, Texas, in Austin Independent School District
Charles H. Houston Elementary School, Washington, D.C., one of District of Columbia Public Schools